is a Japanese manga series written and illustrated by Bakka Okita. It was first serialized in Kodansha's josei manga magazines Kiss Plus (December 2013 to February 2014) and Hatsu Kiss (June 2014 to February 2021), with its chapters collected in seven tankōbon volumes. The series was adapted into a ten-episode television drama broadcast on NHK from July to September 2018.

In 2018, Tōmei na Yurikago won the 42nd Kodansha Manga Award in the shōjo category.

Media

Manga
The magazine ceased its publication on February 8, 2014, and the series was transferred to the brand new magazine  on June 13 of the same year; the magazine switched to digital-only publication on June 25, 2018. The series finished on February 25, 2021. Kodansha collected its chapters in nine tankōbon volumes released from May 13, 2015, to April 13, 2021.

Volume list

Drama
A ten-episode television drama adaptation was broadcast on NHK from July 20 to September 21, 2018.

Reception
On Takarajimasha's Kono Manga ga Sugoi! list of best manga of 2019 for female readers, the series ranked 6th. The series ranked 11th on the "Nationwide Bookstore Employees' Recommended Comics of 2017" poll by Honya Club online bookstore. In 2018, the series won the 42nd Kodansha Manga Award in the shōjo category.

References

Further reading

External links
  
  
 

Kodansha manga
Medical anime and manga
NHK television dramas
Josei manga
Winner of Kodansha Manga Award (Shōjo)